Peredur Owen Griffiths is a Welsh Plaid Cymru politician who has served as Member of the Senedd (MS) for the South Wales East region since the 2021 Senedd election.

He previously ran unsuccessfully in the Blaenau Gwent constituency at the 2019 United Kingdom general election.

References

Living people
Plaid Cymru members of the Senedd
Wales MSs 2021–2026
Welsh-speaking politicians
1978 births